Rowing events at the 2021 Southeast Asian Games took place at Thủy Nguyên Boat Racing Center, in Hải Phòng, Vietnam from 9 to 14 May 2022.

Medal table

Medalists

Men
Two bronze medals were awarded in men's double sculls event as two teams crossed the finish line at the exact same time.

Women

References

Rowing
2021
2022 in rowing